The Pentecostal Assemblies of the World, Inc. (P.A.W.) is one of the world's largest Oneness Pentecostal denominations, and is headquartered in Indianapolis, Indiana. While it began in 1906 with Trinitarian beliefs, it was re-organized in 1916 as Oneness Pentecostal, thus making it the oldest organization of this type.

History
The origin of the P.A.W. can be traced to the teachings of Charles Parham in Topeka, Kansas (1901), and the Azusa Street Revival led by William Joseph Seymour in Los Angeles, California (1906–1909). During this time it was a loose fellowship of churches that were united by the infilling of the believer with the Holy Ghost, and adherence to the doctrine of holiness.

For the next few years, the Pentecostal Assemblies of the World focused upon general meetings and the development of its organizational structure. The late Bishop Morris E. Golder wrote: "The original organization bearing the name of the Pentecostal Assemblies of the World came into existence in the year of 1906 in the city of Los Angeles, State of California." This was also the position asserted by former Presiding Bishop of the Pentecostal Assemblies of the World Ross Paddock. He declared that after one year of being organized, the Pentecostal Assemblies of the World had its first annual business meeting and that, at the same time, it was Trinitarian in its doctrine and liturgy of water baptism.

According to Dr. David D. Bundy, a Pentecostal historian at the Christian Theological Seminary, as early as 1907, a white Baptist minister in Los Angeles, was preaching non-Trinitarian water baptism in the name of Jesus. According to Dr. Deborah Sims LeBlanc, William and Maggie Bowdan, the parents of former Assistant Presiding Bishop Frank Bowdan, were baptized in the Name of Jesus after the Azusa Street Mission Revival (1906–1909).

As an outgrowth of the Asuza Street movement, a fellowship of "pentecostal assemblies" met in October 1907 in Los Angeles, and followed-up with similar meetings in subsequent years. This fellowship was known as the Pentecostal Assemblies of the World. J. J. Frazee (the P.A.W.'s first General Overseer) and G. T. Haywood participated in these meetings.

In 1913, hundreds of preachers attended a camp meeting in Arroyo Seco, California. Evangelist R.E. McAlister was selected to preach on the subject of water baptism at a baptismal service. He began speaking on the different modes of baptism, mentioning triune immersion by which the candidate was immersed three times face forward. He summed it up by “they justify their method, by saying that baptism is in the likeness of Christ's death, and make a point from scripture that Christ bowed his head when he died.” To Trinitarians, it was necessary to baptize once for each person in the Godhead (Father, Son, and Holy Ghost). He concluded his message abruptly by saying that the scriptural answer to this was that the Apostles invariably baptized all their converts a single time in "the name of the Lord Jesus Christ", and the words Father, Son, and Holy Ghost were never used by the early Church in Christian baptism. McAlister was taken aside at the time and told not to preach this new theory about the “baptismal formula.” However, many hearing McAlister speak received the new revelation of the name Jesus. Three important men who attended and were influenced by this new revelation; were Frank J. Ewart, G. T. Haywood, and Glenn A. Cook.

For an entire year (1913-1914), intense and bitter debate raged within the association regarding the Godhead and the "new issue." Essentially, there were two questions around which the debate was centered:

 "Is there one God, or are there three distinct persons in the Godhead? and; 
 How then, should an individual be baptized - "in the Name of the Father, Son and Holy Ghost", or in "the Name of Jesus?"

By the spring of 1914, Ewart accepted the Oneness formula and became one of its leading advocates. He reached the conclusion that the singular “name” in Matthew 28:19 was Jesus Christ, and that the one true God who had revealed himself as Father, in the Son, and as the Holy Spirit was none other than Jesus Christ (a form of Modalistic Monarchianism). To support this view, he pointed to Colossians 2:9, which states that in Jesus dwells all the fullness of the Godhead bodily. Ewart explained his discovery to other Pentecostal ministers, some of whom rejected his teaching, but others enthusiastically embraced it.

On April 15, 1914, Ewart re-baptized Glenn A. Cook, his assistant and a veteran evangelist of the Azusa Street Mission, in the name of Jesus Christ, and Cook re-baptized Ewart. This would set in motion an issue that would divide the Pentecostal movement between the Trinitarians and the "Jesus Name only", or "Oneness" believers. Afterward, they began re-baptizing thousands of Pentecostals with the shorter formula “in the name of Jesus”, claiming those baptisms performed with the citation of Matthew 28:19 were invalid, and that baptism must be performed “in the name of Jesus” (only). Additionally, those who had been baptized in the threefold titles of “Father, Son and Holy Spirit”, must renounce that baptism and be re-baptized with "the Name of Jesus" pronounced over them, before they can be regarded as biblically baptized by Oneness Pentecostals.

Consequently, in 1914, the Pentecostal Assemblies of the World experienced its first split. Those leaders and individuals who embraced the Trinitarian concept pulled out from the association. Many of the whites who left the Pentecostal Assemblies of the World at this time would eventually form the Assemblies of God organization. During this transition period (about one year), they received their ministerial credentials from the Church of God in Christ organization.

In 1915, the Pentecostal Assemblies of the World was reorganized in Indianapolis, Indiana, at Christ Temple Assembly of the Apostolic Faith, where Bishop G. T. Haywood was the pastor. At that meeting, Bishop Haywood was appointed as the organization's first General Overseer and their headquarters were moved from Los Angeles, California to Portland, Oregon.

Among those who accepted the Oneness doctrine and played a tremendous role in the early days of the Pentecostal movement was Garfield Thomas Haywood, an African American minister, who was pastor of a very successful Pentecostal Church called "Christ Temple Apostolic Faith Assembly" in Indianapolis, Indiana. In 1915, the racial make up of the congregation was about 50% African American and 50% white. It instantly became one of the largest Pentecostal congregations in the world when Bishop Haywood was re-baptized in the Name of Jesus, and together, the two men re-baptized the entire congregation of 465 members.

In 1918, J.J. Frazee chaired a business meeting in St. Louis that produced a merger between the P.A.W. and the General Assembly of Apostolic Assemblies (founded January 2, 1917 GAAA). The newly merged-group retained the name Pentecostal Assemblies of the World. Later that year, E. W. Doak became Chairman and W. E. Booth-Clibborn, grandson of the Booths who founded the Salvation Army in London, became Secretary. This interracial organization was the only Oneness Pentecostal organization until late 1924, when a separation occurred, mainly along racial lines, by the splitting off of most of the whites into the Pentecostal Church, Inc.

On January 25, 1919, the Pentecostal Assemblies of the World was formally incorporated in the state of Indiana and the headquarters were moved from Portland, Oregon to Indianapolis, Indiana. The incorporators were E. W. Doak, G. T. Haywood, and D. C. O. Opperman.

In 1925, the organization established a Board of Bishops consisting of five members. One of these five members, G. T. Haywood, was then elected as the "Presiding Bishop".

In 1932, the Pentecostal Assemblies of the World was reorganized. They elevated Elder Samuel Grimes of New York to the office of Bishop, and elected him as the new Presiding Bishop. Bishop Grimes was born in Barbados, British West Indies. He was saved under the ministry of Elder W. W. Rue. He was also greatly influenced by Bishop G. T. Haywood. Bishop Grimes served as a missionary to Liberia, West Africa, along with his wife. He also founded and established the Eastern District Conferences, which consists of 13 Conferences (Councils). He also became the second editor of The Christian Outlook, which is the official magazine of the Pentecostal Assemblies of the World. He served in the office Presiding Bishop for 35 years (1932–1967) which is longer than any other individual to date. It was during the time that he served in that capacity that the Pentecostal Assemblies of the World's also established procedures regarding the filling of pastoral vacancies.

In 1945, the Pentecostal Assemblies of Jesus Christ and the Pentecostal Churches, Inc. merged and formed the United Pentecostal Church. This Oneness group is the largest numerically of all the Oneness groups. Historically, it has been predominantly white. Racial issues are one of the main causes of their split from the P.A.W. The two organizations have since embraced each other condemning discrimination and hatred on the basis of race.

Leadership and organization
While William Joseph Seymour is considered the initial founder, D.C.O.(Daniel Charles Owen) Opperman, E. W. Doak, and Garfield Thomas Haywood were the initial incorporators. J. J. Frazee was elected the first head and was titled "General Overseer".

The head of the organization held the title of "General Elder" or "General Overseer" until 1925, when it was changed to Presiding Bishop. At the same time they established an executive board consisting of five members (Bishops). G. T. Haywood, one of the five members, was elected as the first "Presiding Bishop". This is in slight contrast to the current Board of Bishops which now consists of 12 formal members, and also includes lay-directors from various regions of the United States, and emeritus bishops who once served, but are either semi or fully retired.

While the original intent for replacing "overseer" with the word "bishop" for this role may not have been to signify an additional tier of leadership above that of a pastor, this tradition has become sanctioned organizational doctrine. In essence it has served to redefine the meaning of the word, by making it distinct from Shepherd/Pastor/Overseer, which is contrary to New Testament doctrine where bishop is used as a synonymous term. Conversely, there are no formally acknowledged apostles and only rarely is the title prophet used by those in the ministerial ranks in this day, and both titles are absent from the current leadership structure. The caveat is that apostles are acknowledged in their original role of establishment of the church and the commitment of the body to follow their epistles governing Christian conduct. Additionally, since the change in 1925, other levels/titles have subsequently been added/amended to the organizational structure which include: district elder and suffragan bishop continuing the adoption of a more episcopal polity approach.

The following is a listing of the bishops which have served as head of the organization since 1925 and includes their race (countering those who have attempted to state that the P.A.W has continued to be a "black-only" organization since the split that occurred in late 1924):

Women in leadership roles has been a point of contention within Christian groups since prior to the  organizing of the P.A.W. The organizations evolving stance moving toward total inclusion of women in the bishopric led many assemblies to part ways by leaving the organization and in some cases prior assemblies or organizations responding by limiting or ceasing fellowship with P.A.W. member assemblies altogether.

The organization currently has women in every leadership position (i.e. pastor, district elder, suffragan bishop, and diocesan bishop) with the only exception being that of the office of Presiding Bishop. Aletha J. Cushinberry was the first woman who was elevated to honorary bishop in 2015. Then in 2017 the organization elevated two women to diocesan bishop.

Organizational structure is currently divided into episcopal districts (by state or country), commonly called councils or diocese. Each of these are headed by a diocesan bishop, who is appointed by the Bishop's Board. A diocesan bishop can have as many as three assistants, called suffragan bishops. Suffragan bishops hold only the authority given them by the diocesan bishop. Typically they will have authority over a region or part of a state. Reporting under the suffragan bishop is the office of district elder, who oversees and assists the elders (pastors and their churches) in his district.

The following table contains the listing of Current Episcopal Districts/Dioceses for the organization.

Current emeritus and honorary bishops 

The organization also has structural segments whose general purpose is to ensure specific focus and attention is given to key areas of service to the body. These are called departments and auxiliaries with leadership elected by the organization membership some of which also have individual directors appointed by the board of bishops as their representatives to the organization's executive board. A similar structure exists within each diocese for that particular state/region.

Further reading
Phenomenon of Pentecost by Frank J. Ewart
A Man Ahead of His Times (The Life and Times of Bishop Garfield Thomas Haywood) by Gary Garrett
The Early Pentecostal Revival by James Tyson
The Life and Ministry of William J. Seymour by Dr. Larry E. Martin
Azusa Street by Frank Bartleman
Other Books about Azusa Street Frank Bartleman, William J. Seymour, Larry Martin

See also 
 Christianity in the United States

References

External links 
Pentecostal Assemblies of the World (Official Website)
Missions Department (Official Website)
Men's Department (Official Website)
Youth Department (Official Website)
Singles Department (Official Website) 
Christian Education(Sunday School) Department (Official Website)
Aenon Bible College (Official Website)

Historically African-American Christian denominations
Christian organizations established in 1906
Oneness Pentecostal denominations
Pentecostal denominations established in the 20th century
Pentecostalism in Indiana
Nontrinitarian denominations
1906 establishments in the United States
Religion in Indianapolis